Qomrud Rural District is a rural district (dehestan) in the Central District of Qom County, Qom Province, Iran. At the 2006 census, its population was 6,615, in 1,542 families.  The rural district has 47 villages. The seat of the rural district is Qomrud.

References 

Rural Districts of Qom Province
Qom County